Konsam Phalguni Singh (born 1 March 1995) is an Indian professional footballer who plays as a central midfielder  for Sreenidi Deccan in the I-League.

Club career
Born in Manipur, Phalguni Singh was a part of NISA Manipur which plays Manipur State League. During 2018–19 I-League 2nd Division season he joined TRAU FC. On 14 December 2019, Phalguni Singh made his professional debut in the I-League for Trau FC, against East Bengal. He scored his first ever goal in I League against Sudeva Delhi FC on 28 February 2021. He was awarded the best midfielders award and featured in the team of the season.

Sreenidi Deccan
On 8 September 2021, Phalguni signed a two-year contract with Sreenidi Deccan.

On 27 December 2021, he made his debut for the club against NEROCA, in a 3–2 loss. He was awarded his first Hero of the Match of the season, against Real Kashmir, on 11 March 2022.

Career statistics

Club

References

1995 births
Living people
People from Manipur
Indian footballers
TRAU FC players
Association football midfielders
Footballers from Manipur
I-League players
Sreenidi Deccan FC players